Pilea trianthemoides, the artillery plant, is a species of shrubs or subshrubs in the family Urticaceae, native to Florida and the Caribbean islands, where it grows in waste places and moist thickets. It flowers year round.

Synonyms 
 Pilea microphylla var. trianthemoides
 Pilea serpyllifolia
 Urtica trianthemoides

References 

 GBIF entry
 Swartz, Kongl. Vetensk. Acad. Nya Handl. 8: 68. 1787

trianthemoides